Asphondylia ratibidae is a species of gall midges in the family Cecidomyiidae.

References

Further reading

 
 

Cecidomyiinae
Articles created by Qbugbot
Insects described in 1935

Diptera of North America
Gall-inducing insects
Taxa named by Ephraim Porter Felt